Hamad Rashid Abdulkarim Aman (born 6 December 1989) is a Kuwaiti footballer.

He formerly played for the u-19 team in Kuwait, but recently began to play for the national team.

International career

International goals
Scores and results list Kuwait's goal tally first.

References

External links
 Player profile at Goalzz.com
 
 Player profile at football-lineups.com

Kuwaiti footballers
Kuwait international footballers
Dhofar Club players
Expatriate footballers in Oman
1989 births
Living people
Qadsia SC players
Kuwaiti expatriate footballers
Kuwaiti expatriate sportspeople in Oman
Sportspeople from Kuwait City
Association football midfielders
AFC Cup winning players
Kuwait youth international footballers
Al Tadhamon SC players
Al-Arabi SC (Kuwait) players